Jim Donchess is an American attorney and politician serving as the 56th mayor of Nashua, New Hampshire. Although the position is non-partisan, he is a registered Democrat.

Education

Donchess graduated from Yale University with a major in Art history, then earned a Juris Doctor from the New York University School of Law.

Career 
After practicing as an attorney for a number of years, Donchess first served as the 51st mayor of Nashua from 1984 to 1992. During his tenure, Nashua was recognized by Money magazine as the "Best Place to Live in America." Donchess left office to run unsuccessfully for the United States House of Representatives. He later returned to his private legal practice. 24 years later, he ran for mayor again, against Chris Williams, and won, becoming the 56th mayor of Nashua.

Donchess ran on a platform of improving infrastructure, working to end the opioid crisis, and clean energy.

References

Official website
 

Living people
Mayors of Nashua, New Hampshire
New Hampshire Democrats
Yale College alumni
New Hampshire lawyers
Year of birth missing (living people)
Place of birth missing (living people)
New York University School of Law alumni